Dmitri Aleksandrovich Galiamin (born 8 January 1963) is a Russian football coach/official and a former player who played as a defender.

Club career
Galiamin was born in Moscow. He started playing with hometown's PFC CSKA Moscow, being an automatic first-choice from his second season onwards and helping the team to the double in his final year, 1991.

Aged 28, Galiamin moved abroad, signing with Spanish club RCD Español, managing to appear sparingly during two La Liga seasons and being relegated in his second – he became a starter in 1993–94, helping the Catalans immediately return to the top level.

In the 1995 summer, due to constant injuries, Galiamin retired from the game at 32, after one season with CP Mérida (Spain, second level). In the following decade, already back in his country, he took up coaching, starting with FC Dynamo Saint Petersburg then successively managing FC Kristall Smolensk, FC Khimki, FC Tom Tomsk, FC Anzhi Makhachkala, FC Spartak Nizhny Novgorod and UOR Master-Saturn Yegoryevsk; in 2002, he served as Saint Petersburg's director of football, occupying that position six years later at FC Saturn Moscow Oblast.

International career
During four years, Galiamin represented three national teams – Soviet Union, CIS and Russia – earning a total of 19 caps. With the latter, he was picked for the 1994 FIFA World Cup, playing in the second half of the 1–3 group stage defeat against Sweden.

References

External links
RussiaTeam profile and biography 

Espanyol archives 

1963 births
Footballers from Moscow
Living people
Soviet footballers
Russian footballers
Association football defenders
PFC CSKA Moscow players
RCD Espanyol footballers
CP Mérida footballers
Soviet Top League players
Russian Premier League players
La Liga players
Segunda División players
Soviet Union international footballers
Russia international footballers
Dual internationalists (football)
1994 FIFA World Cup players
Russian expatriate footballers
Expatriate footballers in Spain
Russian expatriate sportspeople in Spain
Russian football managers
Palamós CF managers
FC Dynamo Saint Petersburg managers
FC Khimki managers
FC Tom Tomsk managers
FC Anzhi Makhachkala managers
FC Saturn Ramenskoye managers
Russian Premier League managers
Russian expatriate football managers
Expatriate football managers in Spain
FC Spartak Moscow players